Tang-e Kolajiki Tahalyun (also Romanized as Tang-e Kolājīkī Tahalyūn) is a village in Chin Rural District, Ludab District, Boyer-Ahmad County, Kohgiluyeh and Boyer-Ahmad Province, Iran. In the 2006 census, its population was 69 people across 14 families.

References 

Populated places in Boyer-Ahmad County